Aden Hashi Farah Aero (died 1 May 2008) was the military commander of the Al Shabaab. He was from the Ayr sub-clan, part of the Habar Gidir, which is a branch of the Hawiye clan. He was reportedly married to Halima Abdi Issa Yusuf. He was among several militants killed in a U.S. airstrike on 1 May 2008.

Afghanistan and Al-Qaeda 
Aden Hashi Farah Aero was said to have gone to Afghanistan to train with al-Qaeda before 2001, according to Matthew Bryden of International Crisis Group.

According to International Crisis Group, it was after this stint with the terror organisation that he went back to Somalia in 2003 to set up a network with other al-Itihaad al-Islamiya veterans to assassinate foreigners and opponents, culminating in the eventual deaths of four foreign aid workers and at least ten Somali former military and police officers. On 10 June 2006, The Guardian repeated this story by stating, "An unnamed network run by one of Aweys's proteges, Aden Hashi Farah "Aero", has been linked to the murder of four western aid workers and more than a dozen Somalis who allegedly cooperated with counter-terror organisations."

He was placed in charge of the Shabaab by Hassan Dahir Aweys, but an October 2006 article in The Economist indicated  Aweys may have had some regrets regarding the appointment.

Attempt on life 
Theresa Whelan, the U.S. deputy assistant secretary of defense for African affairs, in a press conference on 17 January 2007, said she believed the U.S. AC-130 gunship raid which occurred on 8 January had killed eight fighters linked to Aden Hashi Farah Aero. Aero was believed to have been wounded in the attack and perhaps killed. However, on 7 March 2007 an audio tape issued by Aden Hashi Aero was sent to the Koran Radio station in Mogadishu.

Al-Qaeda in Somalia 
According to intelligence provided to Somalia's Deputy Defence Minister, Salad Ali Jelle, Aden Hashi Aero was named by Al Qaeda as its leader in the war-torn nation. It was also reported by the Associated Press that the United Nations have attributed 16 killings to him, including BBC journalist Kate Peyton. They also reported a failed attempt to bring down an Ethiopian airliner.

Death

On 1 May 2008, Aero and another important leader of the Hizbul Shabaab, Sheikh Muhyadin Omar, were killed by a U.S. airstrike on his house in the town of Dhusamareb. Paul Salopek reported in the Chicago Tribune that jihadists vowed to kill every foreigner in Somalia in response.

See also 
 Islamic Courts Union

References

External links 
U.S. Airstrike Kills Somali Accused of Links to Al-Qaeda The Washington Post May 2, 2008

20th-century births
2008 deaths
Assassinated Al-Shabaab members
Assassinated Somalian politicians
People murdered in Somalia
Deaths by American airstrikes
Somalian Muslims
Year of birth missing
Leaders of Islamic terror groups
Salafi jihadists
2008 murders in Somalia